The PNR EM10000 class is an electric multiple unit commuter trainset that will be operated by the Philippine National Railways on the North–South Commuter Railway. Prior to the reveal of its numbering scheme in October 2021, the train was known as the PNR Sustina Commuter. Set to enter service by 2023, it will be PNR's first trainset to be run on standard gauge and powered by electric traction. The trains are also designed to be interoperable with the Metro Manila Subway.

Background

Tokyu Car's involvement in the Philippines 
Tokyu Car Corporation once constructed diesel multiple units and locomotive-hauled cars for the Manila Railroad Company and its succeeding incarnation, the Philippine National Railways. The company first built twenty JMC class DMUs alongside Mitsubishi Heavy Industries for its short-range services in 1955 as part of Manila Railroad's efforts towards dieselization. In 1968, a daily commuter service to San Fernando, Pampanga was launched, using the MC-300 cars also built by Tokyu.

A second batch of 24 CMC class railcars were ordered for the expanded Metro Manila Commuter Service to Angeles City. The trainsets arrived in batches between 1974 and 1976. By the mid and late 1980s, long-haul commuter services such as those leading to Pampanga were cut due to a lack of funding, political instability, and a government debt crisis.

The CMC and JMC were then retired from service in 2004 after being replaced by ex-JNR 12 and 14-series locomotive-hauled coaches, referred to as the 7A-2000 class.

PNR electrification plans 
Numerous plans to electrify the PNR network have been made since 1978, most notably the discontinued Northrail project which would have used the European 25 kV AC railway electrification standard. It was cancelled in 2011 due to alleged overpricing and reports of anomalous deals. The Northrail project was then revived in the late 2010s as the North–South Commuter Railway but now uses the Japanese  electrification standard.

Development 
The Japan Railway Technical Service (JARTS) developed the STRASYA standard in 2004. It is an acronym for Standard Urban Railway System for Asia and are Japanese-built trains exported for use by other Asian countries. Meanwhile, the newly-formed Japan Transport Engineering Company introduced the  platform at InnoTrans 2012. This was shortly after Tokyu Car was reorganized and renamed as a result of its acquisition by the East Japan Railway Company. Its main distinction from other commuter train families is that the trainsets are constructed with lightweight stainless steel manufacturing technology patented by J-TREC.

The National Economic and Development Authority has then required all new railroad projects to use standard-gauge track in 2016. The North–South Commuter Railway, successor to the Manila–Clark rapid railway and Northrail projects, was announced the following year as a mostly elevated mainline.

Purchase 
The Department of Transportation (DOTr) opened a bidding in July 2018 for the purchase of 104 electric railcars, equivalent to thirteen 8-car trainsets for Phase 1 (Tutuban–Malolos segment) of the NSCR. The joint venture of Sumitomo Corporation and Japan Transport Engineering Company (J-TREC) was awarded the  contract on July 2, 2019, and the contract signed on July 16. The trains were purchased under Contract Package CP 03. An additional order for 304 commuter cars (38 train sets) under Contract Package CP NS-02 for Phase 2 (Malolos–Clark segment) and Phase 3 (Solis–Calamba segment) that would be built to the same specifications of the first batch was awarded to the same joint venture on January 14, 2022.

Production 
The Department of Transportation unveiled pictures of the trainsets under production on May 15, 2021 with the completion of the first B15C bogies. The first trainset was finished on October 7, 2021. Delivery started on October 18, 2021 with each car being carried by semi-trailer trucks to the Port of Yokohama. The first train arrived at the Port of Manila on November 21, 2021. The remaining 11 trainsets are still under production at the company's main facility in Yokohama until 2024.

Specifications 

The EM10000 class' design is part of the larger sustina (trademarked in all-lower case format) family of electric trainsets and is largely based on the Sustina Commuter design. These sets in particular are based on existing Japanese designs such as East Japan Railway Company's E233 series and E235 series, the latter being another derivative of the sustina platform. The design has also been adopted to standard-gauge track, as with the variant operated by Bangkok's Purple Line. Each train is composed of 8 cars, expandable to 10. At its base form, it is twice longer than the 4-car trains of the LRTA 2000 class of 2003, its nearest counterpart in Metro Manila.

The class also adopted a new red-orange livery, having been revised from a bluish-purple livery adopted for the original proposal in 2019. This is after the DOTr unveiled the driver's cab of the units on June 28, 2021. They also feature eagle design highlights on the sides of the train.

Mechanical 
The bogies will be different from the DT and TR series used in Japan due to a difference in track gauges. The bogies will be of bolsterless type. One of the bogies appear to carry the serial number B15C according to images obtained by the Philippine Railway Historical Society.

During the design stage, the trainsets were set to use American Tightlock coupling (Type H) according to design documents. The coupling system was later changed to Shibata close-contact after the first trainset was unveiled.

Electrical 
The trains will use  power through overhead lines, making the electrification system standards the same as Japan, and the same as the Metro Manila Subway. All motor cars will have a single-arm pantograph in each car. While the main source of traction are variable-voltage/variable-frequency drive (VVVF) inverters driving the AC motors, batteries and auxiliary power consisting of static inverters will also be used to power the train's lighting and controls as well as allowances for moving slowly (at  ) in case of an emergency before coming to a complete stop. The electrical components are required to be tropicalized and would have insulation requirements following IEC 60085 Thermal class 200 specifications.

Signalling and safety equipment 
The trains will adopt ETCS Level 2 for signalling and train control which combines Eurobalise with the GSM-R communication system. Allowances have been considered for the future adoption of automatic train operation (ATO). Lastly, station platforms will have platform screen doors which will only open after the train doors do the same for safe boarding. Boarding time on the trainsets will be limited to 30 seconds.

The ETCS equipment packages first underwent a non-competitive bidding as procurement and direct contracting.

Interior 
The design capacity for an 8-car trainset is 2,266 passengers with 2,242 being regular seats and standees and another 24 wheelchair spaces. Meanwhile, a future expanded 10-car variant will have 2,656 standing and regular seated passengers. Seating capacity will be different for lead and intermediate cars. Lead cars at each end of the train will have 211 standing passengers, 45 seated and 3 wheelchair spaces for a total of 269 passengers per car. Meanwhile, intermediate cars will have 231 standing, 54 seated and 3 wheelchair spaces for a total of 288 passengers per car. All seats will be of a single class and there will be no Green Class-style bilevel cars used by its Japanese counterparts. There are priority seats and wheelchair spaces on the train as per Japanese standards. However, unlike the Airport Express trains, there are no toilets on board.

For end cars, an additional pair of single-type pocket doors will be installed on the car cabs.

The trains will feature LCD screens above the doors which displays the NSCR line map and the car number.

Formation 

The following are the definitions of the three-letter designation system.
 L refers to the lead car or control car. The Japanese equivalent for this type is KuHa.
 M refers to a powered intermediate car. According to bidding documents, all motor cars have its own pantograph. Its Japanese equivalent is MoHa.
 T refers to an unpowered intermediate (trailer) car. Its Japanese equivalent is SaHa.

Operations 
The first trainset arrived at the Port of Manila on November 21, 2021, two weeks ahead of the schedule set by the DOTr. This first trainset was unveiled on March 18, 2022. During this stage, the trains will be initially stored at the Malanday yards. It will then be subjected to testing before the commencement of regular operations on the Tutuban–Malolos segment (Phase 1) by 2023. Once operational, it will be used for both Commuter and Commuter Express services. Three routes were planned in 2018: –New Clark City; –; and Tutuban–Calamba.

See also 
 E233 series – Japanese narrow-gauge commuter trainsets in which the EM10000 design is derived from.
 E235 series – Another narrow-gauge commuter design belonging to the same sustina family, which the sides of the EM10000 trains is derived.
 MRTJ 1000 series – Indonesian narrow-gauge variant of the STRASYA for the Jakarta MRT.

Notes

References 

Philippine National Railways
Rolling stock of the Philippines
Train-related introductions in 2022
1500 V DC multiple units
J-TREC multiple units